Hypotrachyna boquetensis is a species of foliose lichen in the family Parmeliaceae. It was first described scientifically by lichenologist Mason Hale as a member of the genus Parmelia; he transferred it to the genus Hypotrachyna a year later. It has also been recorded from India.

References

boquetensis
Lichen species
Lichens described in 1974
Lichens of Central America
Lichens of India
Lichens of South America
Taxa named by Mason Hale